Pinecraft is a census-designated place located in Sarasota County. The neighborhood is a popular winter vacation spot for many North American Amish and Mennonites, particularly from Indiana, Ohio and Pennsylvania.

History

"Pinecraft" became the new name in 1925 or 1926 of what had been the Sarasota National Tourist Camp, consisting at the time of 466 campsites, most of them  in size, with a small public park at the present site of Pinecraft Park, a community house, and a water tank.

Sometime after 1926, another tourist camp called Homecroft was laid out on adjacent property west and north of Pinecraft, which sometime after 1946 was incorporated into Pinecraft. Homecroft, about 1/4 mile by 1/2 mile in size, was bounded by Hacienda Street on the north, Yoder Street (then Lee Drive) on the west, Schrock Street (then Acacia Street) on the south, and Beneva Road (then Beneva Drive) on the east.

The transition from camps to residential areas occurred gradually, with major housing construction beginning in the early 1940s, continuing briskly through the 1940s and into the 1950s.  The roads were paved around 1949–1950. In 1949 single lots at Pinecraft sold for $200, corner lots for $225.

Mennonite and Amish churches
The Mennonite Tourist Church at 3340 Bahia Vista Avenue has been a landmark from the time it was purchased by Mennonites in 1946 for $7,500, . Prior to the purchase, the Kruppa bakery occupied the land. The church had attendance at the first Sunday services of 531 people. It was used by both Mennonites and Amish in separate services for a period of time. Starting in 1947 it was also used as a school for children vacationing in Florida, though by 1949 or 1950 the county built a school for Pinecraft children at the corner of Beneva Road and Bahia Vista Street. The Amish have a separate church located at 1325 Hines Avenue.

Transportation from the north
Amish from Indiana and Ohio travel to Pinecraft on buses of the Crossroad Tours company of Shipshewana, Indiana, and Pioneer Trails company of Millersburg, Ohio, which has "Florida Line Runs" all months except June and July. From Pennsylvania many Amish travel on buses of Elite Coach of Lancaster County, Pennsylvania, whose "Florida Line Run" has once-weekly journeys from January through March, and on those of Melard Coach, which provides transportation most weekends from late December through March. Both Elite Coach and Melard Coach provide service from multiple points in Lancaster County.

Media
Season 2 of Breaking Amish, Breaking Amish: Brave New World, was filmed in Pinecraft. It was received with overall backlash from the community. In fact, one of the restaurant staples in Pinecraft, Der Dutchman, released a statement emphasizing that the corporate office didn't support the production. This release was given after Der Dutchman already allowed filming within the restaurant.

See also
Sarasota Christian School, a Mennonite school in Sarasota

References

External links

 "Pinecraft Amish Village" on Facebook (sponsored by the Sarasota Chamber of Commerce)

Literature
 
 

Amish in the United States
Mennonitism in the United States
Sarasota, Florida
Neighborhoods in Florida
Pennsylvania Dutch culture
Census-designated places in Sarasota County, Florida